Paulino Alcántara Riestrá (7 October 1896 – 13 February 1964) was a professional football player and manager who played as a forward. Born in the Philippines, he spent most of his playing career at Barcelona, and also represented Catalonia, the Philippines and Spain internationally.

Alcántara made his debut for Barcelona at the age of 15, and remains the youngest player to play or score for the club. He scored 395 goals in 399 official and friendly matches, a club record that stood for 87 years. After retiring as a player in 1927 at the age of 31, he became a doctor. Alcántara served as a club director between 1931 and 1934. In 1951, Alcántara became a coach and managed Spain for three games.

Club career

Early career 

Alcántara was born in Concepcion, Iloilo, the Philippines to a Spanish military officer and an Ilongga mother. He was three years old when his family moved to Barcelona, the same year that FC Barcelona was formed by Joan Gamper. Alcántara was slated to play for FC Galeno when he was discovered by Gamper. He then joined Barcelona's youth team. He made his debut at the age of 15 years, 4 months and 18 days old on 25 February 1912 against Catalá SC in the Campionat de Catalunya (Catalan football championship) at the Camp de la Indústria. Barcelona won that game 9–0, with Alcántara scoring the first three goals of the game, setting the still unbroken record for being the youngest player to ever score for FC Barcelona in an official match. Among his teammates during his time at the club were Francisco Bru Sanz, Jack Greenwell and Romà Forns. He went on to help the club win two Campionat de Catalunya in 1913 and 1916 and the 1913 Copa del Rey (Spanish Cup), in which he missed the final that ended in a 2–2 draw with Real Sociedad, but then played in the replay as Barcelona came-out as 2-1 winners.

Bohemian Sporting Club 
In 1916, Alcántara's parents returned to the Philippines and took their son with them. There he continued his studies in medicine and played football for the Bohemian Sporting Club. He helped the club win two Philippine Championships; in 1917 and 1918. He was selected for the Philippine national football team in 1917 and represented his country at the Far Eastern Championship Games in Tokyo, helping them defeat Japan 15–2, which is still the Philippines' biggest win in international football. He also represented the Philippines at table tennis. Meanwhile, Barcelona had failed to win a major trophy in his absence and the club pleaded in vain with his parents to allow him to return to Spain. However, he contracted malaria in 1917 and apparently refused to take the prescribed medication until he was allowed to go back.

Return to Barcelona 
After returning to Barcelona, his former teammate and manager Jack Greenwell experimented by playing Alcántara as a defender, but Alcántara did not succeed in that position. The paying members of Barca's club membership, "Els Socis," demanded that Alcántara be switched back to his normal position, which saw him return to the forward line. In 1919, he helped the club win another Campionat de Catalunya. The club also reached the 1919 Copa del Rey Final but lost 2–5 to Arenas Club de Getxo, courtesy of a hat-trick from future teammate Félix Sesúmaga. On 13 April 1919 in a game at Les Corts against Real Sociedad, Alcántara scored the "police goal," when a policeman got in the way of a powerful shot, so both the ball and policeman ended up in the back of the net. In 1920 the club won another Copa del Rey and the Campionat de Catalunya, with Alcántara scoring in the 2–0 win over Athletic Bilbao in the Cup final. The squad included Emilio Sagi Liñán, who formed a partnership with Alcántara as well as Ricardo Zamora, Josep Samitier and Félix Sesúmaga. This marked the beginning of the club's first golden era and saw them dominate both the Campionat de Catalunya and the Copa del Rey. Alcántara scored twice in the 1922 Cup final, where Barcelona defeated Real Unión 5–1 and scored the winning goal in the 3–2 win over Atlético Madrid in the 1926 final.

International career 
Like many other FC Barcelona players at the time, Alcántara was summoned to play for the Catalonian national team several times, making his debut on 3 January 1915 against the “North team” (a Basque Country XI). In May 1915, he was a member of the Catalan side that participated in the first edition of the Prince of Asturias Cup, an inter-regional competition organized by the RFEF. He scored the first-ever goal of the competition in the opening game against the Centro team (a Castile/Madrid XI), which ended in a 2–1 win, but a loss to North in the following game prevented them from winning the tournament. Alcántara also represented Catalonia in the last edition of the Prince of Asturias Cup in 1926, which was a two-legged tie between the previous two champions, Catalonia and Asturias, for the right to keep the trophy, and Alcántara netted in the second leg in a 4–3 win, thus contributing decisively in helping Catalonia to win a record-breaking third Prince of Asturias Cup title.

In 1917 he was selected by the Philippines national team and represented the country at the Far Eastern Championship Games in Tokyo, helping them defeat Japan 15–2, which became the Philippines' biggest win in international football.

In 1920 Alcántara, along with Zamora, Samitier and Sesúmaga, was selected to represent Spain at the 1920 Summer Olympics. However, Alcántara chose to stay at home to take his final medical exams. Without him, Spain was eliminated in the quarter-finals by the eventual champions Belgium, the same team against which he eventually made his debut on 7 October 1921, aged 25, scoring both goals in a 2–0 win. In 1922, he was nicknamed "El Rompe Redes" or "Trencaxarxes" (the net breaker) after he broke the net with a shot during a match against France. In total, he made five appearances and scored a then-national record of six goals for Spain between 1921 and 1927.

Retirement
Alcántara retired on 3 July 1927 in order to become a doctor at age 31, the same day that FC Barcelona played against Spain in a testimonial match in his honour. He later served as a club director between 1931 and 1934. Alcántara was one of the first footballers to write memoirs of his playing days. In 1951, Alcántara was one of three selectors, along with Félix Quesada and Luís Iceta, that coached Spain for three games against Switzerland, Belgium and Sweden. He won one game and tied the other two.

Spanish Civil War 
In the 1930s, Paulino Alcántara was a member of the Falange Española, the variant of Spanish Fascism. On 4 August 1936, he fled to Andorra and France after Franco's coup failed to take Barcelona on 18 July 1936. In 1936 Alcántara was a Carlist volunteer and participated in numerous military operations of the nationalist troops of Francisco Franco.
During the Spanish Civil War, Alcántara was Lieutenant of the first battalion of the Brigade Legionary Black Arrows (Frecce Nere). The Black Arrows was a volunteer corps (Corpo Truppe Volontarie) directed directly by Benito Mussolini.
With the Black Arrows, Alcantara served on the fronts of Guadalajara, Aragon and Catalonia. With General Yagüe, he entered Barcelona victoriously on 26 January 1939.
After the Spanish Civil War, Paulino Alcántara lived in Barcelona and was Lieutenant of the Black Arrows.
During the Spanish State, Alcántara was a Chief of the Falange Española Tradicionalista y de las JONS.

Legacy
Alcántara is known for his feats with FC Barcelona, scoring 395 goals in 399 matches; a club record which was broken by Argentine footballer Lionel Messi about a century later in 2014. He is considered by Barcelona as one of its "legends". However, in his native country, the Philippines, Alcántara had limited recognition until the 2010s, partially caused by a surge of popularity of football in the Philippines.

In 2018, the domestic cup tournament of the Philippines Football League, the Copa Paulino Alcantara was named in his honor. He was also named part of the Philippine Sports Hall of Fame in 2021.

Career statistics

Club

International
Scores and results list Spain's goal tally first.

Scores and results list Philippines's goal tally first.

Scores and results list Catalonia's goal tally first.

Honours
Barcelona
 Pyrenees Cup: 1912, 1913
 Copa del Rey: 1913, 1920, 1922, 1925, 1926
 Catalan football championship: 1913, 1916, 1919, 1920, 1921, 1922, 1924, 1925, 1926, 1927

Bohemian
 Philippines Championship (2): 1917, 1918

See also
 List of Spain international footballers born outside Spain

References

External links

 
 
 Asian Paulino Alcántara at RSSSF
 Player profile at FC Barcelona

1896 births
1964 deaths
Filipino people of Spanish descent
Spanish people of Filipino descent
Spanish Falangists
Bohemian S.C. players
FC Barcelona players
Filipino footballers
Filipino expatriate footballers
Spanish footballers
Spanish expatriate footballers
Filipino expatriate sportspeople in Spain
Spanish expatriate sportspeople in the Philippines
Sportspeople from Iloilo City
Citizens of the Philippines through descent
Footballers from Iloilo
Philippines international footballers
Spanish football managers
Spain international footballers
Spain national football team managers
Dual internationalists (football)
Footballers from Barcelona
20th-century Spanish physicians
Filipino football head coaches
Visayan people
Association football forwards
Catalonia international footballers
Philippine Sports Hall of Fame inductees
Spanish syndicalists